John Edward Blair (May 30, 1899, Monroe, Maine – March 26, 1980) was an American bacteriologist and serologist. He was the president of the American Society for Microbiology in 1962.

Biography
Blair graduated in 1920 with a bachelor's degree from Clark University. At Brown University, he graduated in 1921 with an M.S. and in 1923 with a Ph.D. in bacteriology. From 1923 to 1926 he was an instructor in bacteriology at Stanford University. In 1927 he became a bacteriologist and serologist at Manhattan's Hospital for Joint Diseases. He headed the hospital's department of bacteriology from 1927 to 1964, when he became a consultant in bacteriology. In 1944, Blair and Joseph Buchman (1898–1965) at the Hospital for Joint Diseases were awarded a contract for the investigation of the effects of penicillin on osteomyelitis lesions. From 1964 to 1968 Blair was the head of the department of microbiology at Roosevelt Hospital (which is now named Mount Sinai West).

Blair did research on tuberculosis, staphylococcal infections, and staphylococcal phage typing. From 1958 to 1966 he chaired the International Commission on Staphylococcal Phage Typing of the International Union of Microbiological Societies.

He was elected in 1933 a fellow of the American Association for the Advancement of Science. In 1957 he received the Kimble Methodology Research Aeard.

In September 1923, John E. Blair married Lorraine Hunter Ferguson. They had two sons: Donald Ferguson and Malcolm John.

Selected publications

References

External links
  (photo, 1957)

1899 births
1980 deaths
American bacteriologists
Serologists
Clark University alumni
Brown University alumni